Serine/threonine-protein kinase 16 is an enzyme that in humans is encoded by the STK16 gene.

Interactions 
STK16 has been shown to interact with NAGK.

References

Further reading